Novigrad is a village and municipality in Croatia in the Zadar County. According to the 2011 census, there were 2,375 inhabitants, absolute majority of which were Croats.

History 
In 1386, the Hungarian and Croatian sovereign Mary and her mother, Elizabeth of Bosnia, were imprisoned in Novigrad. Elizabeth was strangled in Novigrad in 1387 but Mary was liberated. It was part of Republic of Venice in 1409. Venetian rule in Novigrad briefly interrupted by Ottoman occupation between 1646 and 1647 during Cretan War.

Attractions
The historic little town on the southern side of the Novigrad sea is situated in a narrow bay. The Novigrad sea is abundant in fish and shellfish, which is why Novigrad fishermen are well known. The town has preserved its Mediterranean architecture, and partially also its system of fortification. The vicinity of the Zrmanja River allows for attractive canoe, kayak or rafting excursions.

References

External links
  

Municipalities of Croatia
Populated places in Zadar County
Territories of the Republic of Venice